Đorđe Zafirović (Serbian Cyrillic: Ђорђе Зафировић; born 26 February 1978) is a retired Serbian professional football player.

Statistics

External links
 

1978 births
Living people
Serbian footballers
Association football midfielders
FK Milicionar players
FK Partizan players
FK Teleoptik players
FK Zvezdara players
FK Vojvodina players
FK Proleter Zrenjanin players
FK Budućnost Banatski Dvor players
FK Banat Zrenjanin players
FK Smederevo players
FK Modriča players
Serbian SuperLiga players
Serbian expatriate footballers
Expatriate footballers in Bosnia and Herzegovina